The Parañaque Integrated Terminal Exchange (PITX) is a public transport terminal in Parañaque, Metro Manila, Philippines. PITX is built and operated by Megawide Construction Corporation and the Department of Transportation (DOTr) under the Philippine government's Public-Private Partnership program.

It replaced the older Southwest Integrated Transport Terminal (SITT) initially located at the derelict Uniwide Coastal Mall, which was transferred to HK Sun Plaza in Bay City, Pasay as the Southwest Interim Provincial Terminal (SWIPTS).

Opened on November 5, 2018, PITX serves as a hub for buses, jeepneys, and other public utility vehicles headed for areas south of Metro Manila, including the provinces of Cavite and Batangas, and vice versa. It is projected to accommodate around 200,000 passengers. The terminal is also planned to connect with the Asia World station of the proposed Line 1 Cavite extension.

Location 
The Parañaque Integrated Terminal Exchange is located on a  site in AsiaWorld, a subdistrict of Bay City in Parañaque, where  is currently used for transport services, commercial spaces, and office buildings, while the remaining  will serve as part of a ₱5 billon expansion project of the terminal and will be allocated for additional bus services.  It is situated near the north end of the Manila–Cavite Expressway (CAVITEX) just off Macapagal Boulevard and a couple of blocks south of NAIA Road adjacent to the former Uniwide Sales Coastal Mall. Nearby landmarks include the Marina Bay Town and the integrated resorts of Entertainment City, including Okada Manila, City of Dreams Manila and Solaire Resort & Casino.

Platforms 

The bus ticketing counters and boarding gates are located at the terminal's ground floor and second-floor levels, while the arrival bays are only at the second and third gate of the second-floor level. The modern jeepney ticketing counter, boarding gate, and the arrival bays are all located on the second-floor level. For traditional jeepneys, the loading bays are found on the north side of the terminal and the unloading bays are on the south. The UV Express departure and arrival platforms are all located on the third-floor level. The taxi lane area can be found on the ground floor near the main entrance.

Services 

As of November 2019, PITX services the following routes:

Intercity

Bus 
 Premium Point-to-Point Bus Service operates express bus services to Baguio, Batangas City, and Lipa.
 Intercity bus lines operate out of the terminal to Metro Manila destinations such as Monumento via EDSA Carousel, Bonifacio Global City, Sapang Palay, Fairview, Diliman, Santa Maria, Lawton, Alabang, Cavite City, Dasmariñas, Naic, Trece Martires, GMA, and Montalban.

Jeep 
 Modern jeeps operate to Lawton, MIA, Sucat, Alabang, Moonwalk, and Buendia.
 Traditional jeeps operate to Bay City, Binondo (Divisoria), Sampaloc via Quiapo (Blumentritt and Dapitan) for northbound. Alabang, FTI, and Sucat for eastbound.

Provincial

Bus 
 Provincial bus lines operate to and from the following destinations in Batangas: Balayan, Calatagan, Lian, and Nasugbu
 Provincial bus lines operate to and from the following destinations in Cavite: Alfonso, Amadeo, Indang, Mendez, Silang, Tagaytay, and Ternate
 DLTBCo – operates Provincial Bus Service to and from the following destinations in Bicol Region: Bulan, Daet, Legazpi, Naga, and Sorsogon City
 JAC Liner – operates Provincial Bus Service to and from Lucena, Quezon
 Pangasinan Solid North Transit – operates Premium Point-to-Point Bus Service to and from Baguio
 Davao Metro Shuttle - operates Provincial Bus Service to Davao City

Jeep 

 Provincial modern jeeps operate to Dasmariñas (Pala-Pala and Paliparan)
 Provincial traditional jeeps operate to Dasmariñas - DBB and Paliparan; Imus - Anabu Kostal; and Bacoor - extending to Imus City Proper

Future and proposed links 

 The Asia World station of the Line 1 Cavite extension will be linked to the terminal
 A proposed spur line of the Metro Manila Subway will be linked to PITX

References

External links 
 Official website of Parañaque Integrated Terminal Exchange

Buildings and structures in Parañaque
Bus stations in Metro Manila